Farah Nabulsi (born 1978), is an Academy award nominated and BAFTA-winning British-Palestinian filmmaker and human rights advocate.

Early life
Nabulsi was born and raised in London, and is the daughter of a Palestinian mother and Palestinian-Egyptian father. Her father came to the UK to study for a PhD in civil engineering and her mother arrived via Kuwait when her family left Palestine following the Arab-Israeli war in 1967. Nabulsi attended Francis Holland School for girls and is a graduate of Cass Business School, London.

In her late 30s, she switched her career after working in the City as a CFA-qualified stockbroker at a boutique investment bank, and later JP Morgan. She made the decision following a trip to Palestine in 2013 for the first time as an adult to trace her family roots.

Film career
In 2016, she founded Native Liberty Productions, a not-for-profit media production company, that aims to re-humanize the Palestinians and draw attention to the injustices they face. She is also the founder of oceansofinjustice.com, an online educational platform with news from the Israeli-occupied territories.

Nabulsi has been invited to screen her work and speak at various notable events including the United Nations Headquarters in New York where she addressed the delegates in the Trustee Chamber Council.

In 2021, Nabulsi's directorial debut The Present was nominated for the Academy Award for Best Live Action Short Film. On 10 April 2021 it won the BAFTA Award for Best Short Film. The only short that was up for both awards.

Awards and accolades

Filmography

References

External links
 
 
 Farah Nabulsi official site
 Oceans of Injustice official site
 Native Liberty official site

1978 births
Palestinian screenwriters
Palestinian film producers
Palestinian human rights activists
Living people
British people of Palestinian descent